Intesa Sanpaolo S.p.A. is an Italian international banking group. It is Italy's largest bank by total assets and the world's 27th largest. It was formed through the merger of Banca Intesa and Sanpaolo IMI in 2007, but  has a corporate identity stretching back to its first foundation as Istituto Bancario San Paolo di Torino in 1583.

In 2020 the bank served approximately 14.6 million customers in Italy and 7.2 million customers in Eastern and Central Europe, the Middle East and North Africa through several brands such as CIB Bank, VÚB Banka and Bank of Alexandria.

By 2010 its assets had grown to US$877.66 billion, ranking 26th in Forbes Global 2000. The company is a component of the Euro Stoxx 50 stock market index.

History
Banca Intesa and Sanpaolo IMI, the two banks that merged in 2007 to create Intesa Sanpaolo, were themselves the product of many mergers. Cariplo and Banco Ambrosiano Veneto merged in 1998 to form Banca Intesa. The following year Banca Commerciale Italiana joined the group. Sanpaolo IMI was born in 1998 following the merger of Istituto Bancario San Paolo di Torino, which specialized in retail banking, and IMI (Istituto Mobiliare Italiano), an investment bank.

Banca Intesa
The oldest part of the banking group is Cariplo S.p.A. which traces its roots to the Austrian Empire household savings bank Cassa di Risparmio delle Provincie Lombarde which was established in 1823 in Milan. The cassa di risparmio was started by an Italian philanthropic group, the Central Committee of Charity; a response by the government to the hard economic times of the early 19th century. In the early 20th century the bank helped Italian companies in the North obtain capital during and after World Wars 1 and 2, chiefly under the guidance of Giordano Dell'Amore. Banking reforms in 1990 started by Giuliano Amato (Amato Law) led to the restructuring/reorganization of banks by forcing the government to relinquish control of them (the result was a more market-driven bank that focused less on social programs/social causes were abandoned).

Cariplo S.p.A was formed in 1991 when Cassa di Risparmio delle Provincie Lombarde (sold by Ente Cassa di Risparmio delle Provincie Lombarde ) merged with its subsidiary IBI.  Banco Ambrosiano Veneto originated with Nuovo Banco Ambrosiano and Banca Cattolica del Veneto which merged in 1989.  The bank increased in size during the 1990s due to numerous acquisitions (Citibank Italia, Banca Vallone di Galatina and European securities dealer Caboto among others).

Banca Commerciale Italiana

Banca Commerciale Italiana (BCI) started in 1894 as a corporate loans lender operating in the commercial industry of Northern Italy.  In 1994 Mediobanca purchased an interest in BCI (ironically BCI was one of the 3 banks that formed Mediobanca almost 50 years earlier).  BCI tried to acquire Banco Ambrosiano Veneto the same year but was spurned by shareholders who wouldn't accept the US$1.13 billion offer.  In 1999 Italy's largest bank Unicredit Group at the time, attempted a hostile takeover of BCI but failed due to Mediobanca's interest in the company (Mediobanca wanted to merge Banca di Roma with BCI). BCI merged with the former Banca Ambrosiano and Cariplo in 1998 to form a financial institution renamed Banca Intesa in 2003.

Sanpaolo IMI
Sanpaolo IMI was formed in 1998 when Istituto Bancario San Paolo di Torino (founded in 1563) and Istituto Mobiliare Italiano (IMI) merged, (IMI itself was established in 1931) in a US 37.8 billion dollar deal.

Intesa Sanpaolo
In January 2007, Banca Intesa and Sanpaolo IMI, two of the three largest bank of Italy, officially merged.

As part of the authorization of the merger, the Italian Competition Authority (AGCM) forbid Intesa Sanpaolo to open any new branches for two years in the provinces of Udine and Gorizia (Friuli – Venezia Giulia region), provinces of Rovigo and Padua (Veneto region), Aosta Valley, provinces of Biella and Alessandria (Piedmont region), Province of Bolzano (South Tyrol), Province of Bologna (Emilia-Romagna region), Province of Pavia (Lombardy region), Province of Naples (Campania region), Province of Imperia (Liguria region), provinces of Sassari and Cagliari (Sardinia Island), Province of Rieti (Lazio region), province of Terni (Umbria region), Province of Pesaro-Urbino (Marche region), Province of Pescara (Abruzzo region) and Province of Catanzaro (Calabria region).

The French banking group Crédit Agricole started to spin off from Intesa Sanpaolo, by acquiring Cariparma, FriulAdria in 2007 and Carispezia in 2011, as well as branches from Intesa Sanpaolo. In 2012, Crédit Agricole sold all the shares of Intesa Sanpaolo.

In December 2007, Cassa di Risparmio di Biella e Vercelli was also sold to Banca Monte dei Paschi di Siena for €399 million.

In 2008, Intesa Sanpaolo acquired Banca CR Firenze. In December 2008, Cassa di Risparmio di Fano was sold to Credito Valtellinese.

In 2009, group acquisitions included a 30% interest in business info company MF Honyvem, and an increased stake in Alitalia – Compagnia Aerea Italiana up to 33.3%  Even though the bank was rumoured to have been working with the government to keep Air France from acquiring a stake in Alitalia, Air France eventually acquired 25%. Alitalia – Compagnia Aerea Italiana sold part of its stake in the airline to Etihad Airways in 2015.

From 2012 to 2013, Intesa Sanpaolo wrote down the value of the investment in Banca delle Marche (a minority interest of 5.84% share capital) for a total of €90 million (€18 + 72 million), as well as €26 million for a minority stake in Cassa di Risparmio della Provincia di Chieti in 2014. The shareholders of the banks were bail-in in the rescue plan in 2015.

In 2014, Cassa di Risparmio di Venezia and Banca di Credito Sardo were absorbed into Intesa Sanpaolo. The 2014–17 business plan of the bank stated that the banking group would simplify their legal structure.

In 2015, local banks Banca Monte Parma, Banca di Trento e Bolzano, Cassa di Risparmio di Civitavecchia, Cassa di Risparmio di Rieti and Cassa di Risparmio della Provincia di Viterbo were absorbed into Intesa Sanpaolo. Banca dell'Adriatico and Casse di Risparmio dell'Umbria were planned to be absorb by Intesa Sanpaolo in mid-2016. A unified website was also used for the remaining retail banks of the group in 2016.

In 2016–17, the banking group also sold their non-core businesses, such as the 0.49% ordinary shares of Visa Europe in cash plus share deal; Intesa Sanapolo Card and subsidiary Setefi to Mercury (the parent company of Istituto Centrale delle Banche Popolari Italiane) for €1.035 billion and 4.88% shares of Bank of Italy to the bank's shareholders Compagnia di San Paolo, Fondazione Cariplo and the pension funds of the group for €366 million.

On 26 June 2017, as part of a government-funded bailout of the depositors (and the bail-in of the investors of the failed banks), Intesa Sanpaolo acquired the good assets of Banca Popolare di Vicenza (BPVi) and Veneto Banca, including some of the subsidiaries such as Banca Apulia and Banca Nuova. The branches of BPVi and Veneto Banca would at first became branches of Intesa Sanpaolo, but some of them would be closed down in the near future for efficiency, as Intesa Sanpaolo was also one of the major banks in the Veneto region which the failed banks based. In October 2017, the plan to absorb Banca Nuova into Intesa Sanpaolo was also announced. In December 2017, the plan to absorb Cassa di Risparmio del Friuli Venezia Giulia was announced.

On 6 February 2018, 10 further mergers were announced in the 2018–2021 business plan: Banco di Napoli. Banca CR Firenze, CR Pistoia e della Lucchesia, CR Veneto, Carisbo, Cariromagna, Banca Apulia, Banca IMI, Banca Prossima and Mediocredito Italiano.

On 17 February 2020, Carlo Messina unexpectedly announced the launch of a voluntary OPS (public exchange offer) for 4.9 billion euro towards UBI Banca which provided for the delivery of 17 Intesa Sanpaolo shares for every 10 UBI Banca shares newly issued with a premium of 27.6% compared to the stock market listing on Friday 14 February. In addition, on 27 April 2020 Intesa, which has access to three million UBI customers, obtained from the extraordinary shareholders' meeting the approval of a capital increase in support of the takeover bid.

The operation is complex as, to prevent possible problems with the Antitrust Authority, it involves other companies. UnipolSai has already reached an agreement to take over the business branches of the insurance companies Banca Assurance Popolari, Lombardia Vita and Aviva Italia, owned by UBI. The Bolognese insurance group supported the share capital increase of 802.26 million euros of BPER Banca, the Emilian bank of which it is the first shareholder with 19.9%. In turn, BPER has already signed a contract with Intesa which provides for the purchase of 532 UBI branches with approximately 1.2 million customers, of which approximately half in Lombardy. In July 2020, the antitrust authority ordered Intesa to sell as many of its own branches, in the event that the public subscription offer does not reach 67% of the shares. The transaction, which obtained the approval of the various Italian and European authorities, led to the delisting of UBI and provides for the merger between the two banks.

The sale is scheduled for the end of 2020, with the aim of closing the financial statements in April 2021, presenting a credit institution in seventh place in Europe in terms of size, with a value of assets under management of 1.1 trillion, loans for 460 billion and profits for five. The offer ends on 30 July 2020 with the achievement of 91.0149% of the capital of UBI. Therefore, having exceeded 90% of the share capital, the delisting procedures have begun which have led Intesa Sanpaolo to become the sole shareholder of UBI Banca.
Intesa is required to complete the sale of 500 agencies within six months of the completion of the merger.

On 5 October 2020 was announced Intesa Sanpaolo's private bank arm has reached an agreement to buy a 69% in Swiss-based bank REYL & Cie.

In August 2022, ISP completed the 100 percent acquisition of the Luxembourg private bank CBP Quilvest. The transaction is intended to create a second private banking hub to complement the Swiss one.

Major shareholders

Intesa Sanpaolo's shareholders with more than a 3% stake

Many shareholders of the group were the former owner (foundation) of the saving banks that were acquired by Intesa and Sanapaolo IMI through shares swap. For example, as of 31 December 2013, Fondazione Carisap (Ascoli) held 0.3537% shares, Fondazione Carisbo (Bologna) held 2.023%, Fondazione Cariparma (Parma, now part of Crédit Agricole Group) held 0.67%, Fondazione Carispezia (La Spezia, now part of Crédit Agricole Group) held 0.25%, Fondazione di Venezia (Venice) held 0.33215%.

Corporate Governance

Intesa Sanpaolo has a single-tiered corporate governance system in which the Board of Directors alone are in charge of strategic supervision and control. The latter duty is carried out by the Management Control Committee instead of the Board of Directors itself. The bank adopted this single-tiered system in April 2016, replacing the former two-tiered structure. Previously, the supervisory board exercised control and strategic management functions, whereas the management board oversaw the management of the company's business. The supervisory board was appointed by shareholders in their annual meeting. It supervised the activities carried out by the management board and, in particular, approved the main strategic initiatives proposed by the management board. The management board appointed one of its members to be the CEO.

Board of directors

Members were appointed on 27 April 2016 for the following financial years: 2016, 2017 and 2018.

Financial information
Table with a comparison of Intesa Sanpaolo financial performance over the last years.

Business Units
The group's operations are segmented into 7 parts
Banca dei Territori - By far the largest division is the company's domestic commercial bank in Italy. Subsidiaries include Mediocredito Italiano, Banca Prossima and Banca 5.
Corporate and Investment Banking - Present in 29 countries this division acts as a "global partner" supporting the development of financial institutions, both nationally and internationally.
International Subsidiary Banks - Present in 10 countries spanning central eastern Europe, the Middle East, and North Africa.
Insurance Division includes subsidiaries Fideuram Vita, Intesa Sanpaolo Assicura and Intesa Sanpaolo Vita
Capital Light Banks includes Intesa Sanpaolo Re.O.CO.
Eurizon Capital - Italy's largest asset manager that invests in such things as bonds (including government), publicly traded companies and also engages in short term borrowing and lending. 
Private Bank Division - includes Intesa Sanpaolo Private Banking, Sirefid, Intesa Sanpaolo Private Banking Suisse and Banca Fideuram that offers financial advice services. It was created in 1968 as a subsidiary of IMI (later merged with Sanpaolo and then Banca Intesa to form the current company) with the purpose of managing IMI's Luxembourg mutual fund business.  In 1992 it was merged with another subsidiary Manusardi, which is when it officially became Banca Fideuram.   In 1997 it entered the private banking industry, 2000 it became a broker after acquiring French Company Groupe Wargny (was established in 1806, some of the Wargny business was sold in 2007) then in 2004 its parent company IMI took over its life insurance business.  Its association with US company Frank Russell group gave it a foothold in the personal financial planning market.

Subsidiaries
In addition to its strong presence in Italy, Intesa Sanpaolo has branches and representative offices around the world. The Group also directly controls many foreign banks especially in Central and Eastern Europe, with around 1,600 branches and about 8.3 million clients operating in retail and commercial banking.

Photo gallery

See also

 Inter-Alpha Group of Banks

References

External links

Information about the Intesa Sanpaolo (in English)

 
Banks of Italy
Financial services companies of Italy
Insurance companies of Italy
Banks under direct supervision of the European Central Bank
Companies based in Turin
Financial services companies established in 2007
Banks established in 2007
Italian companies established in 2007
Companies in the Euro Stoxx 50
Italian brands